Steven Smith (born April 4, 1963) is a Canadian former professional ice hockey player who played for the Philadelphia Flyers and Buffalo Sabres in 17 National Hockey League (NHL) games.

Playing career
Smith was drafted 16th overall in the 1st round of 1981 NHL Entry Draft by the Philadelphia Flyers, from the Sault Ste. Marie Greyhounds. He played his first eight NHL games in November 1981, which was ultimately the most games he played in any of his five NHL seasons. Despite being drafted in the first round and being regarded as a highly rated prospect, Smith was unable to parlay his talent into an NHL career and played most of his professional career in the minors. After winning the Calder Cup as a member of the Hershey Bears in 1987–88, Smith left the Flyers organization in the off-season and signed with the Calgary Flames. Before playing any games with his new team he was claimed by the Buffalo Sabres in the NHL Waiver Draft and saw his last NHL action early in the 1988–89 season.

Career statistics

References

External links

1963 births
Living people
Belleville Bulls players
Brunico SG players
Buffalo Sabres players
Canadian ice hockey defencemen
EK Zell am See players
Hershey Bears players
Ice hockey people from Ontario
National Hockey League first-round draft picks
People from Quinte West
Peterborough Petes (ice hockey) players
Philadelphia Flyers draft picks
Philadelphia Flyers players
Rochester Americans players
Sault Ste. Marie Greyhounds players
Springfield Indians players
Canadian expatriate ice hockey players in the United States
Canadian expatriate ice hockey players in Austria
Canadian expatriate ice hockey players in Italy